Willy Langkeit (2 June 1907 – 27 October 1969) was a German general during World War II. He was a recipient of the Knight's Cross of the Iron Cross with Oak Leaves of Nazi Germany. After the war, Langkeit joined the Bundesgrenzschutz (Federal Border Guards) in 1951, retiring in 1967.

Awards and decorations
 Iron Cross (1939) 2nd Class (10 November 1939) & 1st Class (30 August 1940)
 German Cross in Gold on 1 July 1942 as Major in the II./Panzer-Regiment 36
 Knight's Cross of the Iron Cross with Oak Leaves
 Knight's Cross on 9 December 1942 as Major and commander of I./Panzer-Regiment 36
 Oak Leaves on 7 December 1943 as Oberstleutnant and commander of Panzer-Regiment 36

References

Citations

Bibliography

1907 births
1969 deaths
People from Olecko County
People from East Prussia
Recipients of the Gold German Cross
Recipients of the Knight's Cross of the Iron Cross with Oak Leaves
Commanders Crosses of the Order of Merit of the Federal Republic of Germany
German prisoners of war in World War II held by the United Kingdom
Major generals of the German Army (Wehrmacht)
Brigadier generals of the German Army